Joseph Augustin Normand (1753–1808) was a French naval architect and engineer.

References

First French Empire
1753 births
1808 deaths
French naval architects